Ghormeh sabzi or Khoresht sabzi, also spelled qormeh sabzi, is an Iranian herb stew. It is considered the national dish of Iran. It is a very popular dish in Iran.

History 
Ghormeh sabzi dates back as far as 5,000 years and originated in Iran.

Etymology
The word ghormeh is borrowed from Turkish and means pieces of meat that have been sautéed," while sabzi is the Persian word for herbs.

Preparation

The main ingredients are a mixture of sauteed herbs, consisting mainly of parsley, leeks or green onions, and coriander, seasoned with the key spice of dried fenugreek leaves. The herb mixture has many variations. 
Any dark bitter greens can be used, such as kale, mustard greens, or turnip greens, although none are part of the original recipe.

This mixture is cooked with kidney beans, yellow or red onions, black lime (pierced dried limou-Amani Persian lime), and turmeric-seasoned lamb or beef. The dish is then served with polo (Persian parboiled and steamed rice) or over tahdig. 

The Financial Times noted that there is much disagreement among Iranians on the ingredients used in the stew.

Cultural importance 
Self magazine listed ghormeh sabzi as one of twelve of the most meaningful dishes among cultures passed down among families.  The Tehran Times wrote that the dish "is one of the most prominent dishes in Persian culinary heritage." 

Iranians in the diaspora traditionally celebrate "International Ghormeh Sabzi Appreciation Day" two days after Thanksgiving.

See also
Iranian cuisine
List of stews
Saag

References

External links
Ghormeh Sabzi (recipe, ingredients, instructions, and variety)
Ghormeh Sabzi recipe and picture
Ghorme Sabzi (Ghormeh Sabzi ) Recipe 
Ghorme Sabzi recipe
Iranian Stews (Khoresh)
Extremely Easy to Follow Qormeh Sabzi Recipe
Persian Cooking Finds a Home in Los Angeles 

Iranian stews
Vegetable dishes
National dishes